The Repealing and Amending Act, 2019 is an Act of the Parliament of India that repealed 58 Acts. It also made minor amendments to the Income Tax Act, 1961 and The Indian Institutes of Management Act, 2017. The Act was the sixth such repealing act aimed at repealing obsolete laws tabled by the Narendra Modi administration, and the first tabled during its second term. The government had repealed 1,428 Acts during its first term between 2014 and 2019.

Background and legislative history
Prime Minister Narendra Modi advocated for the repeal of old laws during his 2014 general election campaign. At the 2015 Economic Times Global Business Summit, Modi stated, "Our country suffers from an excess of old and unnecessary laws which obstruct people and businesses. We began the exercise of identifying unnecessary laws and repealing them. 1,877 Central laws have been identified for repeal."

The Repealing and Amending Bill, 2019 was introduced in the Lok Sabha on 25 July 2019 by the Minister of Law and Justice, Ravi Shankar Prasad. The bill sought to repeal 58 Acts and pass minor amendments to two Acts. The amendments were made to substitute certain words in the Income Tax Act, 1961 and The Indian Institutes of Management Act, 2017. Moving the bill for a vote in the House on 29 July, Prasad stated that the Modi administration had repealed 1,428 "old and archaic Acts" during its first term. The Minister also noted that most of the laws being repealed were enacted before independence and that only 1,929 old laws had been repealed between 1950 and 2004. Prasad also urged the House to pass the bill unanimously.

Speaker Om Birla asked the House whether the bill could be passed unanimously. Congress MP for Thiruvananthapuram, Shashi Tharoor requested the Speaker push the vote on the bill to the next day and instead permit an hour-long discussion. In response, the Speaker permitted Tharoor to speak for ten minutes and stated that the vote would be held afterwards. Tharoor sought changes to some provisions of the Indian Penal Code including those concerning sedition. Prasad replied that he disagreed with Tharoor's demand to repeal the sedition law. In the subsequent vote, the bill was passed unanimously by the Lok Sabha.

Prasad moved the bill in the Rajya Sabha on 2 August. He stated, "I would urge the House that this is the initiative in the right direction. I would urge this House and through this House the entire country and state governments that periodic review of obsolete and irrelevant laws must become a part of good governance." Telangana Rasthra Samithi MP K. Keshava Rao expressed concern over the repeal of The Andhra Pradesh Reorganisation (Amendment)  Act, 2014 and The Andhra Pradesh Reorganisation (Amendment)  Act, 2015. Prasad responded that the state's interest were protected as the provisions of the amendments had been incorporated into the main Act.

The Minister also responded to a suggestion to repeal The Cinematograph Act, 1952 stating that he agreed with the idea having previously served as Minister of Information and Broadcasting. However, he noted that "the film community should have one voice on this". Other members who participated in the discussion included Jaya Bachchan (SP), Prashant Nanda (BJD), Subhashish Chakraborty (AITC), Amee Yajnik (Congress), A. Navaneethakrishnana (AIADMK), Kahkashan Perween (JD-U), K. Somaprasad (CPI-M), Binay Visham (CPI), Bhupendra Yadav (BJP), Veer Singh (BJP) and Ram Kumar Verma (BJP). The bill received support from members across party lines and was passed by the Rajya Sabha through voice vote.

The bill received assent from President Ram Nath Kovind on 8 August, and was notified in The Gazette of India on the same date.

Repealed Acts
The 58 Acts included in the bill's First Schedule were completely repealed.

References

Law of India